The Real World: San Diego is the fourteenth season of MTV's reality television series The Real World, which focuses on a group of diverse strangers living together for several months in a different city each season, as cameras follow their lives and interpersonal relationships. It is the fourth season of The Real World to be filmed in the Pacific States region of the United States (specifically in California) after The Real World: San Francisco, Los Angeles and Seattle.

The season featured a total of eight cast members over the course of the season, as one Frankie was replaced after she voluntarily left the show.  The season was filmed from August 16 to December 14, 2003. The season premiered on January 6, 2004, and consisted of 26 episodes. This was the first of two seasons to be filmed in San Diego, the second being the twenty-sixth season. The premiere was watched by approximately 4 million viewers.

Assignment
Almost every season of The Real World, beginning with its fifth season, has included the assignment of a season-long group job or task to the housemates, continued participation in which has been mandatory to remain part of the cast since the Back to New York season. The San Diego cast worked in San Diego Bay as crew members for Next Level Sailing on a boat named Stars & Stripes, which carried visitors daily. Before beginning their regular duties as tour guides, which included preparing yachts for excursions, piloting them in San Diego Bay, and providing maintenance, the cast had to undergo a course in sailing, and navigating the vessels. This created a problem for Frankie Abernathy, who has a phobia of large metal objects, such as boats, and is initially frightened by the sight of the harbor.

The residence

The cast's residence was a custom-designed, two-story house at 4922 North Harbor Drive in San Diego. The house, formerly a Blue Crab Seafood restaurant and a marine supply company, sits on the edge of the southeast end of Driscoll's Wharf, overlooking America's Cup Harbor in Point Loma. During filming of the series, the property included a sand volleyball court and basketball court.

Cast

: Age at the time of filming.

Episodes

Rape allegation
A 22-year-old woman claimed she was raped in the Real World house sometime during the night of November 14, 2003 by an acquaintance of Real World cast member Randy Barry, identified in local reports as "Justin", who was staying at the house as a guest. The woman claimed the man bought her a drink at a downtown San Diego nightspot, and that she blacked out after drinking it. Cast member Jamie Chung found the young woman lying naked on the bathroom floor of the Real World house as Justin emerged, saying, "I just hit that." That person then dressed the woman and moved her to the living room couch, where Chung, upon arriving home on the morning of November 15, found her. Chung then helped that other person move the woman to the downstairs guest bedroom. Chung and the camera crew woke the woman at 10:30 a.m. while cameras were rolling. Chung told the woman that she may have been sexually assaulted in the bathroom during the night, but the woman, according to Chung, appeared disoriented and had difficulty speaking. With the woman's help, Chung contacted a male friend of hers and arranged for her transportation home. Feeling pain in her genital region, the woman reported the incident to police on November 16, and a subsequent medical examination revealed abrasions to both her vagina and anus. According to police, the woman believes her assailant drugged her, brought her back to the Real World house and then while she was unconscious, raped her in the bathroom, since that is the only place in the house where the show's cameras are off-limits.

Another cast member told police that he had seen the woman barely able to stand up in the bathroom, mumbling incoherently, and looking confused, according to the search warrant.

The police sexual assault unit began investigating the next day, November 17, but the Real World cast and crew had left on the cast's group trip to Mexico, and all film from November 14 and 15 had been shipped from the house to the production headquarters in Los Angeles. Kevin Lee, the on-site producer of show, told police he had not viewed the footage but that, after talking to the cast, believed the woman might have been raped, and confirmed that Justin was resident in the house at the time of the alleged assault. Lee agreed to supply the police with the consent forms and photo ID cards that listed who was in the house at the time of the incident, and gave them a tour of the house, allowing them to search the bathroom for evidence.

At the end of the tour, however, Lee received a phone call from Pam Naughton, an attorney representing Bunim-Murray Productions, which produces the show. Naughton refused to permit the police to search the bedrooms and stated that the producers would not turn over any documents or film until she personally reviewed them. The police then obtained a search warrant on November 18, and raided the house, confiscating the film-editing computer, the cast's e-mail computer, bedding, towels, videotapes, and other possible items of evidence. After examining hours of footage taped for the show and seizing evidence at the scene, police made no arrests, and the San Diego County District Attorney's office concluded there was not enough evidence to warrant any charges.

Nearly a month of footage from the season ended up on the cutting room floor due to the allegation. While Charlie Dordevich only appears in three episodes, he lived in the house almost as long as Frankie, who appeared in the first 23 episodes.

TV Guide critic J. Max Robins opined, "The sexual-assault charge is the most tragic event in a long list of disturbing incidents that have plagued The Real World since it debuted 12 years ago."

After filming
Six months after the cast left the Real World house, all eight of them appeared to discuss their experiences both during and since their time on the show, 2 Punk Rock 4 This: The Real World San Diego Reunion, which premiered on July 9, 2004, and was hosted by Vanessa Minnillo.

Frankie Abernathy, who suffered from cystic fibrosis, died on June 9, 2007, at the age of 25.

At the 2008 The Real World Awards Bash, Jacquese and Robin won in the "Best Phonecall Gone Bad" category, Robin also took Home the award for "Best Brush with the Law" (Brad was nominated in the same category). Other nominees included Jamie and Cameran for "Hottest Female", Brad for "Hottest Male" and "Biggest Playa".

Jamie Chung went on to a career as an actress. Her early roles included appearances on TV shows such as Days of Our Lives and Veronica Mars, supporting parts in feature films like I Now Pronounce You Chuck and Larry, Sorority Row, and Grown Ups. She eventually moved onto larger roles, such as the lead in the ABC Family TV miniseries Samurai Girl, as one of the main cast members in the 2011 feature film Sucker Punch, and as Mulan on the TV show Once Upon a Time. She is currently a series regular, starring as Clarice Fong/Blink, in the TV series based on the X-Men franchise, The Gifted. She is regarded as the Real World alumna with the most successful media career. She married Bryan Greenberg in October, 2015.

Robin Hibbard became pregnant with her first child, Ethan, in 2009. He was followed by Raina, born on January 9, 2015.<ref name="generation">{{cite web|title='REAL WORLDS NEXT GENERATION: SEE THE FORMER CAST MEMBERS' CAMERA-READY KIDS|url=http://www.mtv.com/news/2065104/real-world-castmembers-kids/|author=Jordana Ossad|website=MTV|date=February 2, 2015|access-date=May 13, 2019}}</ref>

Brad Fiorenza married Road Rules: Viewers' Revenge alumna Tori Hall on April 12, 2010. Together they have two children: John Brady Fiorenza (born on August 4, 2011) and Chase Fiorenza (born on January 13, 2015). The couple divorced in 2016.

Cameran Eubanks was a cast member on the Bravo reality television series Southern Charm for its first six seasons. In 2020, she announced her departure from the series. Eubanks and Jason Wimberly's first daughter, Palmer Corrine Wimberly, was born on November 11, 2017. The following year, she spoke about the reasons that led her to cease breastfeeding. In 2021, Eubanks released her first memoir, titled One Day You'll Thank Me''.

The Challenge

Challenges in bold indicate the contestant was a finalist on the Challenge.

References

External links
Official site
"The Real World: San Diego: Meet the Cast". MTV.com
"The Real World: San Diego: Full Episode Synopses and Recaps". MTV.com

San Diego
Television shows set in San Diego
2004 American television seasons
Television shows filmed in California